(Scottish Gaelic for Europe) is long-running current affairs programme broadcast on BBC Alba. The series has been running since 1993 and has covered political and social issues affecting Europe and Europeans over that time including issues affecting the Western Isles. It is broadcast weekly in Scottish Gaelic with English subtitles. The programme has also been credited with awards, including Scottish BAFTAs. It is funded by the Gaelic Media Service and produced by BBC Gàidhlig.  is shown on BBC Alba weekly and used to be shown on BBC Two Scotland until its closure in 2019 for the new BBC Scotland channel.

Reputation
 hit the headlines in May 2008, specially mentioned in the Scottish Broadcasting Commission report. Blair Jenkins, Chair of the Scottish Broadcasting Commission said: 'It was intriguing to note that without fail at every one of our public events BBC2 Scotland's  programme was raised, unsolicited, and by non-Gaelic speakers, as an example of a positive, well-respected programme'. The programme is an argument for Gaelic broadcasting and the Gaelic Digital Service as the programme attracts well over the amount of Gaelic speakers.

Presenters
Current presenters are:

 Annabel MacLennan
 Andrew MacKinnon

Past presenters include:
 Anne McAlpine
 Angela MacLean
 Andreas Wolff
 Roddy Angus Munro
 Iain MacInnes
 Alasdair Fraser
 Colin Mackinnon
 John Morrison
 Derek Mackay
 Anna Macleod
 Susie Algie

See also
 Seachd Là

References

External links
 Eòrpa
 BBC Alba

1990s Scottish television series
1993 establishments in Scotland
1993 Scottish television series debuts
2000s Scottish television series
2010s Scottish television series
BBC Alba shows
BBC Regional News shows
BBC Scotland television shows
BBC television documentaries